John Leweston (1506/1507 – 26 April 1584), of Leweston, Dorset, was an English politician.

He was a Member of Parliament (MP) for Dorset in April 1554, Melcombe Regis in 1547, October 1553 and 1555, and Dorchester in 1559 and 1572.

He was married to Joan Leweston. They are both buried in a tomb in St Katherine's chapel in Sherborne Abbey) in Sherborne, Dorset, England.

References

1507 births
1584 deaths
Members of the Parliament of England for Dorchester
Politicians from Dorset
English MPs 1547–1552
English MPs 1553 (Mary I)
English MPs 1554
English MPs 1555
English MPs 1559
English MPs 1572–1583